Saliterribacillus  is a genus of bacteria from the family of Bacillaceae with one known species (Saliterribacillus persicus). Saliterribacillus persicus has been isolated from the Aran-Bidgol lake in Iran.

References

Bacillaceae
Bacteria genera
Monotypic bacteria genera